The Aberdeen City Hall is an historic governmental building located at 125 West Commerce Street, corner of South Hickory Street, in  Aberdeen, Monroe County, Mississippi. It lies across Hickory from the historic U.S. Courthouse and Post Office. Built in 1912, it was designed in a blend of the  Classical Revival and Beaux Arts styles of architecture by New Orleans architect William Drago. On February 22, 1988, the building was added to the National Register of Historic Places. It is still being used today (July 2012) as the city hall of Aberdeen.

References

City and town halls on the National Register of Historic Places in Mississippi
Neoclassical architecture in Mississippi
Beaux-Arts architecture in Mississippi
Government buildings completed in 1912
1912 establishments in Mississippi
National Register of Historic Places in Monroe County, Mississippi